Ocean Grove is a census-designated place (CDP) in the town of Swansea in Bristol County, Massachusetts, United States, on the north shore of Mount Hope Bay near the Cole River. The population was 2,811 at the 2010 census, and 2,904 as of the 2020 census.

Geography
Ocean Grove is located at  (41.728751, -71.209365).

Demographics

At the 2000 census, there were 3,012 people, 1,234 households and 856 families residing in the CDP. The racial makeup of the CDP was 97.28% White, 0.43% African American, 0.10% Native American, 0.27% Asian, 0.23% from other races and 1.69% from two or more races. Hispanic or Latino of any race were 0.37% of the population.

There were 1,234 households, of which 27.8% had children under the age of 18 living with them, 53.8% were married couples living together, 10.5% had a female householder with no husband present, and 30.6% were non-families. 26.5% of all households were made up of individuals, and 10.7% had someone living alone who was 65 years of age or older. The average household size was 2.44 and the average family size was 2.95.

20.8% of the population were under the age of 18, 7.3% from 18 to 24, 30.2% from 25 to 44, 25.6% from 45 to 64, and 16.1% who were 65 years of age or older. The median age was 40 years. For every 100 females, there were 96.6 males. For every 100 females age 18 and over, there were 90.6 males.

The median household income was $43,527 and the median female income was $50,777. Males had a median income of $36,919 and females $22,875. The per capita income was $20,007. About 6.6% of families and 7.7% of the population were below the poverty line, including 9.6% of those under age 18 and 14.9% of those age 65 or over.

References

Census-designated places in Bristol County, Massachusetts
Swansea, Massachusetts
Providence metropolitan area
Census-designated places in Massachusetts